Stadion u Parku is a football stadium in Tivat. It is currently used mostly for football and rugby matches and is the home ground of FK Arsenal and RFC Arsenal. The stadium holds 2,000 people.

History and location
The stadium is located in Tivat's City Park and it has capacity of 2,000 seats. It is situated near the Adriatic coast and by Porto Montenegro Marina.
During most of its history, the stadium is used for football matches. From 2011, the stadium is the home venue of Rugby union team RFC Arsenal.

Pitch and conditions
The pitch measures 110 x 65 meters. Stadium didn't met UEFA criteria for European competitions.

See also
FK Arsenal
RFC Arsenal
Tivat

External links
 Stadium information

References 

Multi-purpose stadiums in Montenegro
Football venues in Montenegro
Football in Montenegro
Tivat